Ip Wai-ming, MH (
born 1965) is the member of the Legislative Council of Hong Kong in functional constituency (Labour) (2008–2012). He is the labour representative of the Labour Advisory Board of the Hong Kong Federation of Trade Unions.

References

1965 births
Living people
Hong Kong Federation of Trade Unions
Hong Kong trade unionists
HK LegCo Members 2008–2012
Members of the Election Committee of Hong Kong, 2007–2012
Members of the Election Committee of Hong Kong, 2021–2026
Alumni of the Hong Kong Polytechnic University
Peking University alumni